Matthias Krizek (born 29 September 1988 in Vienna) is an Austrian former professional cyclist, who rode professionally in 2008, and from 2013 to 2020 for , , the  and . He won the Austrian National Road Race Championships in 2011.

Major results
Source: 

2006
 2nd Road race, National Junior Road Championships
 3rd Overall Trofeo Karlsberg
2008
 4th Raiffeisen Grand Prix
2009
 6th Overall Mainfranken-Tour
2011
 1st  Road race, National Road Championships
 5th Giro del Medio Brenta
2012
 1st Stage 1 Girobio
 3rd Road race, National Road Championships
 3rd Giro del Medio Brenta
 6th GP Capodarco
2014
 1st  Most active rider classification, Tour de Pologne
  Combativity award Stage 12 Vuelta a España
2015
 2nd Road race, National Road Championships
 2nd Overall Okolo Slovenska
2017
 1st Stage 5 Flèche du Sud
2018
 6th Overall Paris–Arras Tour
1st  Mountains classification
 8th Time trial, National Road Championships
2019
 1st  Overall Rhône-Alpes Isère Tour
1st  Mountains classification
 1st  Sprints classification, Tour of the Alps
 National Road Championships
5th Time trial
8th Road race
 5th Overall Oberösterreich Rundfahrt
2020
 10th Grand Prix Gazipaşa

References

External links

1988 births
Living people
Austrian male cyclists
Cyclists from Vienna
21st-century Austrian people